Hans Simonet (born 24 June 1935) is a Swiss former sports shooter. He competed in the 50 metre rifle, prone event at the 1964 Summer Olympics.

References

1935 births
Living people
Swiss male sport shooters
Olympic shooters of Switzerland
Shooters at the 1964 Summer Olympics
Place of birth missing (living people)